Low plasticity burnishing (LPB) is a method of metal improvement that provides deep, stable surface compressive residual stresses with little cold work for improved damage tolerance and metal fatigue life extension.  Improved fretting fatigue and stress corrosion performance has been documented, even at elevated temperatures where the compression from other metal improvement processes relax.  The resulting deep layer of compressive residual stress has also been shown to improve high cycle fatigue (HCF) and low cycle fatigue (LCF) performance.

History 
Unlike LPB, traditional burnishing tools consist of a hard wheel or fixed lubricated ball pressed into the surface of an asymmetrical work piece with sufficient force to deform the surface layers, usually in a lathe.  The process does multiple passes over the work pieces, usually under increasing load, to improve surface finish and deliberately cold work the surface.  Roller and ball burnishing have been studied in Russia and Japan, and were applied most extensively in the USSR in the 1970s.  Various burnishing methods are used, particularly in Eastern Europe, to improve fatigue life.  Improvements in HCF, corrosion fatigue and SCC are documented, with fatigue strength enhancement attributed to improved finish, the development of a compressive surface layer, and the increased yield strength of the cold worked surface.

LPB was developed and patented by Lambda Technologies in Cincinnati, Ohio in 1996.  Since then, LPB has been developed to produce compression in a wide array of materials to mitigate surface damage, including fretting, corrosion pitting, stress corrosion cracking (SCC), and foreign object damage (FOD), and is being employed to aid in daily MRO operations.  To this day, LPB is the only metal improvement method applied under continuous closed-loop process control and has been successfully applied to turbine engines, piston engines, propellers, aging aircraft structures, landing gear, nuclear waste material containers, biomedical implants, armaments, fitness equipment and welded joints.  The applications involved titanium, iron, nickel and steel-based components and showed improved damage tolerance as well as high and low cycle fatigue performance by an order of magnitude.

How it works 
The basic LPB tool is a ball, wheel or other similar tip that is supported in a spherical hydrostatic bearing.  The tool can be held in any CNC machine or by industrial robots, depending on the application.  The machine tool coolant is used to pressurize the bearing with a continuous flow of fluid to support the ball.  The ball does not contact the mechanical bearing seat, even under load.  The ball is loaded at a normal state to the surface of a component with a hydraulic cylinder that is in the body of the tool. LPB can be performed in conjunction with chip forming machining operations in the same CNC machining tool.

The ball rolls across the surface of a component in a pattern defined in the CNC code, as in any machining operation.  The tool path and normal pressure applied are designed to create a distribution of compressive residual stress.  The form of the distribution is designed to counter applied stresses and optimize fatigue and stress corrosion performance.  Since there is no shear being applied to the ball, it is free to roll in any direction.  As the ball rolls over the component, the pressure from the ball causes plastic deformation to occur in the surface of the material under the ball.  Since the bulk of the material constrains the deformed area, the deformed zone is left in compression after the ball passes.

Benefits 
The LPB process includes a unique and patented way of analyzing, designing, and testing metallic components in order to develop the unique metal treatment necessary to improve performance and reduce metal fatigue, SCC, and corrosion fatigue failures.  Lambda modifies the process and tooling for each component to provide the best results possible and to ensure that the apparatus reaches every inch on the component.  With this practice of customization along with the closed-loop process control system, LPB has been shown to produce a maximum compression of 12mm, although the average is around 1-7+mm.  LPB has even been shown to have the ability to produce through-thickness compression in blades and vanes, greatly increasing their damage tolerance over 10-fold, effectively mitigating most FOD and reducing inspection requirements. No material is removed during this process, even when correcting corrosion damage.  LPB smooths surface asperities during machining, leaving an improved, almost mirror-like surface finish that is vastly better looking and better protected than even a newly manufactured component.

Cold working 
The cold work produced from this process is typically minimal, similar to the cold work produced by laser peening, only a few percent, but a great deal less than shot peening, gravity peening or, deep rolling. Cold work is particularly important because the higher the cold work at the surface of a component, the more vulnerable to elevated temperatures and mechanical overload that component will be and the easier the beneficial surface residual compression will relax, rendering the treatment pointless.  In other words, a component that has been highly cold worked will not hold the compression if it comes into contact with extreme heat, like an engine, and will be just as vulnerable as it was to start.  Therefore, LPB and laser peening stand out in the surface enhancement industry because they are both thermally stable at high temperatures.  The reason LPB produces such low percentages of cold work is because of the aforementioned closed-loop process control.  Conventional shot peening processes have some guesswork involved and are not exact at all, causing the procedure to have to be performed multiple times on one component.  For example, shot peening, in order to make sure every spot on the component is treated, typically specifies coverage of between 200% (2T) and 400% (4T).  This means that at 200% coverage (2T), 5 or more impacts occur at 84% of locations and at 400% coverage (4T), it is significantly more.  The problem is that one area will be hit several times while the area next to it is hit fewer times, leaving uneven compression at the surface.  This uneven compression results in the whole process being easily "undone", as was mentioned above.  LPB requires only one pass with the tool and leaves a deep, even, beneficial compressive stress.

The LPB process can be performed on-site in the shop or in situ on aircraft using robots, making it easy to incorporate into everyday maintenance and manufacturing procedures.  The method is applied under continuous closed loop process control (CLPC), creating accuracy within 0.1% and alerting the operator and QA immediately if the processing bounds are exceeded.  The limitation of this process is that different CNC processing codes need to be developed for each application, just like any other machining task.  The other issue is that because of dimensional restrictions, it may not be possible to create the tools necessary to work on certain geometries, although that has yet to be a problem.

See also 
Corrosion fatigue
Damage tolerance
FOD
Fretting
High Frequency Impact Treatment aftertreatment of weld transitions
Laser peening
Metal fatigue
Peening
Residual stress
Shot peening
Stress corrosion cracking
Ultrasonic impact treatment

References 

Beres, W.  "Ch. 5- FOD/HCF Resistant Surface Treatments".  Nato/Otan.  Retrieved 11 December 2008 from ftp://ftp.rta.nato.int/PubFullText/RTO/TR/RTO-TR-AVT-094/TR-AVT-094-05.pdf.  This contains and excellent comparison of several surface treatments.  
Exactech.  "Low Plasticity Burnishing." Retrieved 11 December 2008 from http://www.exac.com/products/hip/emerging-technologies/low-plasticity-burnishing.
Giummara, C., Zonker, H.  "Improving the Fatigue Response of Aerospace Structural Joints."  Alcoa Inc., Alcoa Technical Center, Pittsburgh, PA.  Presented at ICAF 2005 Proceedings in Hamburg, Germany.   
Jayaraman, N., Prevey, P. "Case Studies of Mitigation of FOD, Fretting Fatigue, Corrosion Fatigue and SCC Damage by Low Plasticity Burnishing in Aircraft Structural Alloys."  Presented for the USAF Structural Integrity Program.  Memphis, TN.  2005. 
Lambda Technologies.  “LPB Application Note: Aging Aircraft.”  Retrieved 20 October 2008 from http://www.lambdatechs.com/html/documents/Aa_pp.pdf.  
Migala, T., Jacobs, T.  "Low Plasticity Burnishing: An Affordable, Effective Means Of Surface Enhancement."  Retrieved 11 December 2008 from http://www.surfaceenhancement.com/techpapers/729.pdf.
NASA: John Glenn Research Center. "Fatigue life and resistance to damage are increased at relatively low cost."  Retrieved 11 December 2008 from http://www.techbriefs.com/index.php?option=com_staticxt&staticfile=Briefs/Aug02/LEW17188.html.
Prevey, P., Ravindranath, R., Shepard, M., Gabb, T.  "Case Studies of Fatigue Life Improvement Using Low Plasticity Burnishing in Gas Turbine Engine Applications."  Presented June 2003 at the ASME Turbo Expo.  Atlanta, GA.

Corrosion
Metalworking